"Good God" is a soul/rock song written by Dutch singer Anouk Teeuwe and her then-husband Remon Stotijn and recorded by Anouk. Produced by its writers along with Glen Ballard, the song was released as the first single from Anouk's album Who's Your Momma on 2 November 2007. The song is a playable track in Guitar Hero World Tour.

The music video of "Good God" was recorded in London and directed by Jonas Åkerlund. The video premiered on November 6, 2007 on the news website NU.nl.

Trivia
The song is used in the intro sequence of the Dutch TV-show Kanniewaarzijn.

Charts

Weekly charts

Year-end charts

References

External links
"Good God" music video

2007 songs
Dutch rock songs
Anouk (singer) songs
Music videos directed by Jonas Åkerlund
English-language Dutch songs
Songs written by Anouk (singer)
Song recordings produced by Glen Ballard